Athani Composite PU College is a pre-university college in  Davangere, Karnataka, India. It is affiliated to Karnataka Pre-University Education Board. It is located at 10th cross, A Block in S S Layout. .

Streams offered
The College offers courses in the below mentioned science streams
1. PCMB - Physics, Chemistry, Mathematics, Biology.
2. PCMC - Physics, Chemistry, Mathematics, Computer Science.

Facilities
1. Laboratories
2. Library
3. Well- equipped classrooms
4. Sports grounds

References

Pre University colleges in Karnataka